The first season of the Bungo Stray Dogs anime series based on the manga with the same name by Kafka Asagiri and illustrated by Sango Harukawa. It is produced by Bones was directed by Takuya Igarashi and written by Yōji Enokido. The series focuses on a weretiger named Atsushi Nakajima who joins into the "Armed Detective Agency" who investigate multiple cases while dealing with multiple organizations.

The series premiered on 7 April 2016 and ended on 23 June 2016, being broadcast on Tokyo MX, Teletama, Chiba TV, tvk, GBS (Gifu Broadcasting), Mie TV, SUN, TVQ Kyushu, and BS11. Nobuhiro Arai and Hiroshi Kanno served as the chief animation directors, while the former also served as character designer along with Ryō Hirata. A total of six DVD volumes collected the series from June 24, 2016 to November 25, 2016 Funimation released the entire first season on March 6, 2018, while another compilation will be released on September 17, 2019. Madman released the season's DVD and Blu-ray on February 20, 2019. Madman Entertainment released the DVD box on February 20, 2019 in Australia.

Taku Iwasaki composed the series' music. The season uses two theme songs. Granrodeo performed the anime's opening theme, titled "Trash Candy", and Luck Life  performed the anime's ending theme, titled .


Episode list

Home media releases

North America

Notes

References

Bungo Stray Dogs episode lists